Castra Cumidava was a fort in the Roman province of Dacia. The archaeological site is located on the middle terrace of Bârsa River.

The inscription found in the fort testifies about a Roman cohort of Vindelici who had taken the name Cumidava (Komidava of Ptolemy) from its place of cantonment. The fact that the Romans preserved the Dacian name is quite suggestive. The native Geto-Dacian population, which became the basis for a new civilization, lent its specific characteristics, while the Latin-speaking colonists introduced Roman traits.

The relatively small castrum (110 m x 114 m) belonged administratively to the Dacia Apulensis. It was continuously used by only two cohorts Vindelicorum Cumidavensis (cohors VI and cohors VI Nova).

An inscription from 3rd century AD dedicated to Iulia Mamea was found here:

Iuliae Mameae augustae matri Domini nostri sanctissimi Imperatoris Caesaris Severi Alexandi augusti et castrorum senatusque cohors Vindelicorum Piae fidelis Cumidavensis Alexandrianae ex quaestura sua dedicante la sdio Dominatio legato augusti III Daciarum.

See also
List of castra

Notes

Works cited

External links

Roman castra from Romania - Google Maps / Earth 

Roman Dacia
Archaeological sites in Romania
Roman legionary fortresses in Romania
Ancient history of Transylvania
Historic monuments in Brașov County
Râșnov

ro:Castrul roman Cumidava